The following lists events that happened during 1950 in the Grand Duchy of Luxembourg.

Incumbents

Events

 Unknown – Goodyear tyre factory is opened at Colmar-Berg.

January – March

April – June
 25 June – The Korean War begins.  Luxembourg pledges its support to the United Nations. Soldiers from Luxembourg will form a platoon of A Company, Belgian United Nations Command.

July – September
 17 August – Princess Alix marries Antoine Maria Joachim Lamoral, 14th Prince of Ligne.
 2 September – François Simon replaces Aloyse Hentgen as Minister for Economic Affairs and Agriculture.

October – December
 2 October – The first of Luxembourg's volunteer soldiers departs for the Korean War.
 23 October – Wirtgen Ferdinand is appointed to the Council of State.

Births
 22 January – Marie-Josée Jacobs, politician
 21 April – Pierre Mores, member of the Council of State
 26 April – Jeannot Krecké, politician
 19 May – Anne Brasseur, politician
 15 June – Jup Weber, politician
 29 June – Gaston Gibéryen, politician
 13 July – Georges Wohlfart, politician
 16 July – Henri Grethen, politician
 5 August – Lucien Didier, cyclist
 11 October – Mady Delvaux-Stehres, politician
 26 October – Nico Braun, footballer
 19 December – Jean Portante, writer

Deaths
 1 February – Pierre Prüm, politician and Prime Minister

Footnotes

References